Howard Edward Winklevoss Jr. (born September 1, 1943) is an American actuary. He is an academic and entrepreneur who has a practice in benefits management.

Work
Winklevoss is a former adjunct professor of insurance at the Wharton School of the University of Pennsylvania. He is a graduate of Grove City College and received a DBA in actuarial science from the University of Oregon. He has written more than 20 books, including Pension Mathematics with Numerical Illustrations. He is also the founder of Winklevoss Consultants and Winklevoss Technologies.

Winklevoss is the father of athletes and entrepreneurs Cameron and Tyler Winklevoss.

Selected bibliography
 Pension Mathematics with Numerical Illustrations (1977, 2d ed. 1993)
 Public Pension Plans: Standards of Design, Funding, and Reporting (1979, with Dan McGill)

References

External links
 

1943 births
Living people
People from Mercer, Pennsylvania
Businesspeople from Pennsylvania
20th-century American businesspeople
Wharton School of the University of Pennsylvania faculty
Grove City College alumni
American actuaries
University of Oregon alumni
Winklevoss family